We Got It is the third album by R&B boy band Immature that was released on December 5, 1995. The album featured singles "We Got It" (which sampled Chocolate Milk's 1978 soul hit "Girl Callin'"), "Please Don't Go", "Lover's Groove" and "Feel the Funk" (which also appeared on the soundtrack for the film Dangerous Minds).

In the United States, We Got It peaked at number 76 on the Billboard 200 and peaked at number 14 on Billboards Top R&B/Hip-Hop Albums selling 36,000 copies its first week. On January 1, 1997 the album had sold around 600,000 copies.

Track listing
"We Got It" (featuring Smooth) (Juanita Carter, Sean "Mystro" Mather, Chris Stokes) (3:38)
"Lover's Groove" (Chris Stokes) (4:03)
"Just a Little Bit" (Juanita Carter, Mike Dean, Chris Stokes) (3:51)
"Please Don't Go" (Claudio Cueni, Chris Stokes) (4:31)
"I Don't Know" (Juanita Carter, Sean "Mystro" Mather, Chris Stokes) (3:53)
"Pager" (Lamonte Lassiter) (4:19)
"Crazy" (Davina Bussey) (3:59)
"I Can't Stop the Rain" (Lamonte Lassiter, Derrick Monk, Chris Stokes) (3:44)
"A Boy Like Me" (Chris Stokes, T.J. Thompson) (3:38)
"Candy" (B Team) (4:53)
"When It's Love" (Juanita Carter, Sean "Mystro" Mather, Chris Stokes) (4:03)
"Pay You Back" (Chris Stokes) (4:09)
"Feel the Funk" (Skip Scarborough, Chris Stokes) (4:52)

Single Track Listing
Please Don't Go / We Got ItUS Vinyl, 12" 
A1 Please Don't Go [LP Version] 4:31
A2 Please Don't Go [Padapella Version] 4:31
B1 Please Don't Go [Instrumental Version] 4:31
B2 We Got It [Flava Remix] 4:02
We Got It US Vinyl, 12"A  We Got It [LP Version] 3:42
B1 We Got It [Instrumental] 3:43
B2 We Got It [Acappella] 3:38US Vinyl, 12", PromoA1 We Got It [Wolfies No Rap Edit]
A2 We Got It [Bottom Dollar Vocal Dub]
B1 We Got It [Phreak Dub]
B2 We Got It [Blakkats Bounce Dub]UK Maxi-CD1 We Got It [Album Version] 3:40
2 We Got It [Flava Remix] 3:57
3 Feel the Funk 4:43
4 We Got It [Bottom Dollar Vocal Dub] 6:59UK Vinyl, 12", PromoA1 We Got It [Album Version]
A2 We Got It [Flava Mix]
A3 We Got It [Oakland Remix]
B1 We Got It [Marley Marl Pirate Remix]
B2 We Got It [Marley Marl Pirate Remix Part One]
B3 We Got It [DJ Jam Remix]UK Vinyl, 12", Promo'
A1 We Got It [Bottom Dollar Vocal Dub]
A2 We Got It [Bottom Dollar No Rap Dub]
B1 We Got It [Blakkats Bounce Dub]
B2 We Got It [Phreak Dub]

Charts

Weekly charts

Year-end charts

Certifications

References

1995 albums
IMx albums
MCA Records albums